Solonaima Maria Folau (née Tuta'ia; born 18 February 1987 in Tokoroa, New Zealand) is a retired New Zealand netball player. She played regularly for the New Zealand national netball team, the Silver Ferns.

Early life
Folau was born Solonaima Maria Tuta'ia in Tokoroa on 18 February 1987, the daughter of Fuisami Tuta'ia, a forestry worker, and his wife, Niukini, a homemaker, who in 1983 had moved to New Zealand from Samoa. She was named for her grandmothers, Solonaima and Malia, and she began using her middle name when she entered school as her teacher had difficulty pronouncing her first name. Maria Tuta'ia was an attendee of Lynfield College but in the final year of it, transferred to Mount Albert Grammar School. At MAGS, she became a captain of its first Premier Netball team, which under her command came fourth at the Upper North Island Secondary Schools tournament and New Zealand Secondary Schools' Championships respectively. In 2003, Folau was named in the New Zealand U21 squad and two years later she became part of the winning team that brought home the 2005 World Youth Cup from Miami. That year, she was called into the Silver Ferns team, making her on-court debut when the Ferns toured Jamaica.

Career

Early career
Folau played domestic netball for the Auckland Diamonds during the National Bank Cup from 2005 to 2007. With the start of the ANZ Championship in 2008, she signed with the Waikato Bay of Plenty Magic, partnering Irene van Dyk in the shooting circle. She played with the Magic for two years, before transferring back to Auckland to play with the Northern Mystics, starting in 2010.

Later career
During her senior international career, Maria Folau has won gold medals at the 2010 Commonwealth Games, 2006 Commonwealth Games and the 2009 World Netball Series, in addition to a silver medal at the 2007 World Netball Championships.

In the 2010 ANZ Championship, Folau was the first and only player to be sent off during the match against the Swifts for persistent breaking. This send off happened in the last two minutes of the match and she took no further part in that match.

She is renowned for scoring the crucial goals, such as in the gold medal match against Australia at the 2010 Commonwealth Games, and during the 2011 ANZ Championship season when she scored the winning goal in the dying seconds against the Magic.

In 2014, Folau was inducted into the Mt. Albert Grammar School Hall of Fame.

In 2018 after playing for nine seasons with the Northern Mystics she joined Adelaide Thunderbirds of Suncorp Super Netball for the 2019 season. Folau was the leading goalscorer for the Thunderbirds and won the club's best and fairest award, though she parted ways with the club at the end of the season.

She represented New Zealand at the 2018 Commonwealth Games and 2019 Netball World Cup.

In December 2019, Netball New Zealand announced that Folau had retired from domestic and international netball. She finished her career with 150 caps for the Silver Ferns, the second-most capped player for her nation behind Laura Langman.

In February 2022 it was reported that the Queensland Firebirds were in discussions with Folau.

Personal life
Folau is married to the Tongan Australian rugby player Israel Folau. The two married in Kangaroo Valley, New South Wales on 15 November 2017, in a private outdoor ceremony. She subsequently changed her last name from Tuta'ia to Folau.

References

External links
Northern Mystics profile
ANZ Championship profile
 Netball Draft Central profile

1987 births
Living people
New Zealand netball players
New Zealand international netball players
Commonwealth Games gold medallists for New Zealand
Netball players at the 2006 Commonwealth Games
Netball players at the 2010 Commonwealth Games
Netball players at the 2014 Commonwealth Games
Netball players at the 2018 Commonwealth Games
Commonwealth Games silver medallists for New Zealand
Commonwealth Games medallists in netball
2007 World Netball Championships players
2011 World Netball Championships players
2015 Netball World Cup players
2019 Netball World Cup players
New Zealand expatriate netball people in Australia
Auckland Diamonds players
Northern Mystics players
Adelaide Thunderbirds players
Waikato Bay of Plenty Magic players
Suncorp Super Netball players
ANZ Championship players
New Zealand sportspeople of Samoan descent
Rugby union players' wives and girlfriends
Rugby league players wives and girlfriends
Sportspeople from Tokoroa
People educated at Lynfield College
People educated at Mount Albert Grammar School
New Zealand international Fast5 players
Medallists at the 2006 Commonwealth Games
Medallists at the 2010 Commonwealth Games
Medallists at the 2014 Commonwealth Games